Itea ( meaning willow), is a town and a former municipality in the southeastern part of Phocis, Greece. Since 2011 local government reforms made Iteas a municipal unit of the municipality of Delphi.

Administrative division
The municipal unit Itea consists of the communities Itea, Kirra and Tritaia.

Geography
Itea is situated on the north coast of the Gulf of Iteas named after it, a northward projection of the Gulf of Corinth. The Greek National Road 48 connects Itea with Naupactus, Delphi and Livadeia, the Greek National Road 27 with Amfissa and Lamia.

Historical population

Gallery

See also
List of settlements in Phocis

References

External links

Itea-Parnassos-Delphi

Populated places in Phocis
Mediterranean port cities and towns in Greece
Gulf of Corinth